Peter Gunning (1614 – 6 July 1684) was an English Royalist church leader, Bishop of Chichester and Bishop of Ely.

Life

He was born at Hoo St Werburgh, in Kent, and educated at The King's School, Canterbury and Clare College, Cambridge, where he became a fellow in 1633. Having taken orders, he advocated the Royalist cause eloquently from the pulpit. In 1644, during the English Civil War, he retired to Oxford, and held a chaplaincy at New College until the city surrendered to the Parliamentary forces in 1646. Subsequently he was chaplain, first to the royalist Sir Robert Shirley of Eatington (1629–1656), and then at the Exeter House chapel. After the Restoration in 1660 he was installed as a canon of Canterbury Cathedral. In the same year he returned to Cambridge as Master of Corpus Christi, and was appointed Lady Margaret's Professor of Divinity. He also received the livings of Cottesmore, Rutland, and Stoke Bruerne, Northamptonshire.

In 1661 he became head of St John's College, Cambridge, and was elected Regius Professor of Divinity. While he served as Regius Professor of Divinity he established an Arminian soteriological tradition at Cambridge that was furthered by his successor Joseph Beaumont. He was consecrated bishop of Chichester in 1669, and was translated to the see of Ely in 1674–1675. Holding moderate religious views, he disliked equally Puritanism and Roman Catholicism.

Works
His works are chiefly reports of his disputations, such as that which appears in the Scisme Unmask't (Paris, 1658), in which the definition of a schism is discussed with two Romanist opponents John Spenser and John Lenthall.

Family
A relative of his, Sir Robert Gunning, became a famous diplomat.

References

Citations

Sources

 
 

1614 births
1684 deaths
17th-century Church of England bishops
Regius Professors of Divinity (University of Cambridge)
Alumni of Clare College, Cambridge
Arminian ministers
Arminian theologians
Bishops of Chichester
Bishops of Ely
English male non-fiction writers
English theologians
Lady Margaret's Professors of Divinity
Masters of Corpus Christi College, Cambridge
Masters of St John's College, Cambridge
Participants in the Savoy Conference
People educated at The King's School, Canterbury
People from Hoo St Werburgh
17th-century Anglican theologians